"My Swagger" is a Japanese single by South Korean boy group Got7. It was released on 24 May 2017. It was number-one on the Billboard Japan Hot 100 and reached the third place on the Oricon Singles Chart. It has sold over 61,000 copies.

Track listing

Charts

Weekly charts

Monthly charts

Sales

References

2017 singles
2017 songs
J-pop songs
Japanese-language songs
Got7 songs
Billboard Japan Hot 100 number-one singles